Christopher Gorham (born August 14, 1974) is an American actor who is best known for the ABC series Ugly Betty. He has also appeared in such series as Insatiable, Popular, Odyssey 5, Felicity, Jake 2.0, The Magicians, Medical Investigation, Out of Practice, Harper's Island, Covert Affairs, and Once Upon a Time. He is also the voice of Barry Allen / The Flash in the DC Animated Movie Universe beginning with Justice League: War (2014) and ending with Justice League Dark: Apokolips War (2020).

Early life
Gorham was born in Fresno, California, to David Gorham, a certified public accountant, and Cathryn Gorham, a school nurse. He attended the Roosevelt School of the Arts and graduated from UCLA with a B.A. in Theater in 1996. While in college he participated in many sports, including martial arts, stage combat, fencing, rollerblading, and ballroom dancing.

Career
His first job in the acting business was as an intern on Baywatch (1989). Gorham has appeared in a number of science-fiction TV series, ranging from a starring role in Odyssey 5 to the title character in Jake 2.0. He also had roles on Party of Five, Felicity, and Without a Trace. He has also acted in films, including 2001's The Other Side of Heaven co-starring Anne Hathaway.

Gorham played Harrison John in the WB series Popular and Dr. Miles McCabe in the NBC drama Medical Investigation. He played the lead role in the short-lived CBS series Out of Practice. He was also the lead of ABC Family's original movie Relative Chaos.

Three years after Jake 2.0 ended, Gorham had a recurring role as Henry Grubstick in Silvio Horta's new series, Ugly Betty, and played the main love interest for the series' heroine Betty Suarez (played by America Ferrera). For his role, Gorham was nominated for a Screen Actors Guild Award for Outstanding Performance by an Ensemble in a Comedy Series. He joined the cast full-time for the series' second season. He then left in July 2008, but returned for the season three and then also the season four finale. He starred in the 2009 CBS TV miniseries, Harper's Island, in which characters were killed off every week leading to the eventual reveal of the murderer.

From July 13, 2010, until December 18, 2014, Gorham played blind special ops agent Auggie Anderson on Covert Affairs, leading the main character, a trainee CIA agent played by Piper Perabo, at her new job. The series was highly successful for the USA Network, running for five seasons. The series was cancelled in January 2015. BuddyTV ranked Gorham fifth on its list of "TV's Sexiest Men of 2011".

In 2014 Gorham recurred in the back half of the third season of Once Upon a Time as Walsh, the Wizard of Oz. He played rival pageant coach Bob Barnard on the Netflix series Insatiable which premiered August 10, 2018.

On March 25, 2021, it was announced that Gorham has been cast as Trevor Elliot, the accused client of Mickey Haller in the Netflix series The Lincoln Lawyer with Manuel Garcia-Rulfo as Mickey Haller.

Gorham is also the voice of Barry Allen / Flash in the DC Animated Movie Universe, beginning with Justice League: War (2014) and concluding with Justice League Dark: Apokolips War (2020).

Personal life
Gorham is married to his former Popular co-star, Anel Lopez Gorham, with whom he has three children. His son Lucas was diagnosed with Asperger syndrome. and Gorham has become an autism awareness advocate:I don't think of him as my son with Asperger's. I think of him as my son. He's not wrong. He's not broken. He is who he is. We, as his parents, are going to do our best — as we do with all of our kids — to give him the best shot at having the best life he can.

Filmography

Film

Television

References

External links

1974 births
American male film actors
American male television actors
American male voice actors
Living people
Male actors from Fresno, California
UCLA Film School alumni
21st-century American male actors
20th-century American male actors